Christian Friedrich Weber (1764–1831) was a German New Testament scholar of the Tübingen school.

He was repentant to Hölderlin who called him "the best man in the world" and deacon in Winnenden.

Works
 Neue Untersuchung über das Alter und Ansehen des Evangeliums der Hebräer 1806

References

1764 births
1831 deaths
German biblical scholars